The Interprovincial Professional Hockey League was a short-lived ice hockey league in the Canadian Maritimes. Each of the three teams played each other four times, two home, two away. The league operated for the 1910–11 season, before folding. The Maritime Professional Hockey League took its place the following season.

1910–11 season
Note: W = Wins, L = Losses, T = Ties, GF= Goals For, GA = Goals Against

References
Interprovincial Professional Hockey League history
Defunct ice hockey leagues in Canada
1910 establishments in Canada
1911 disestablishments in Canada
Sports leagues established in 1910
1910–11 in Canadian ice hockey by league